Viridamides are bio-active lipodepsipeptides made by marine cyanobacteria.

References

External links
PubChem - Viridamide A (CHEBI:66361, CHEMBL454256)
Viridamides A and B, lipodepsipeptides with antiprotozoal activity from the marine cyanobacterium Oscillatoria nigro-viridis

Depsipeptides
Alkyne derivatives
Ethers